Gisulf I may refer to:

Gisulf I of Friuli (reigned c. 569 – c. 590)
Gisulf I of Benevento (died 706) 
Gisulf I of Salerno (930–977)